Ugo La Malfa (16 May 1903 – 26 March 1979) was an Italian politician and an important leader of the Italian Republican Party (Partito Repubblicano Italiano; PRI).

Early years and anti-fascist resistance 
La Malfa was born in Palermo, Sicily. After completing his secondary schooling, he enrolled in the Ca' Foscari University of Venice in the Department of Diplomatic Sciences with professors Silvio Trentin and Gino Luzzatto.

During his years at the university, he had contacts within the republican movement of Treviso and other anti-fascist groups. In 1924, he moved to Rome, and participated in the foundation of the Goliardic Union for Freedom. On 14 June 1925, he took part in the first conference of the National Democratic Union, founded by Giovanni Amendola. The movement was later declared illegal under Mussolini's fascist government. In 1926 he graduated from university with a thesis dealing sharply with human rights. During his military service, he was transferred to Sardinia in order to disrupt the anti-fascist publication Pietre, on which he worked. By 1928 he was among those arrested following the 12 April bombing in the Fiera di Milano for allegedly planning to assassinate Italian King Victor Emmanuel III, only to be interrogated and released.

In 1929 he took a job editing the Treccani Encyclopaedia, working under the direction of the liberal philosopher Ugo Spirito. At the request of Raffaele Mattioli he took a job with Mattioli's Italian Commercial Bank in 1933, of which he became director in 1938. During these years, he showed his expertise in both economics and leadership. There he forged relations between anti-fascist groups in order to build a web that formed the Partito d'Azione, over which he presided as a founder.  On 1 January 1943, La Malfa and the lawyer Adolfo Tino succeeded in publishing the first of their clandestine publication, L'Italia Libera. Later that year, La Malfa fled Italy to escape arrest, travelling to Switzerland, where he had contacts with representatives of the British Special Operations Executive. With these he tried to organize a trip to London in order to make use of his personal influence at the Foreign Office. He tried to prevent the Allied invasion of Italy and to obtain a negotiated Italian retreat from the war. Later he returned to Rome in order to take part in the resistance movement with the Partito d'Azione and the Comitato di Liberazione Nazionale.

Republican career 
In 1945 under the reconstruction government of Ferruccio Parri, La Malfa assumed the role of Minister of Transportation. In the following government, under Alcide De Gasperi, he was Minister of Reconstruction, a position later renamed Minister of International Commerce. In February 1946 the first conference of the Partito d'Azione was held, during which Emilio Lussu prevailed in determining party philosophy, and La Malfa and Parri left the party. In March he participated in the constitution of the Republican Democratic Concentration, which supported the republican referendum in June and contested the related general election. La Malfa and Parri were both elected to the Constituent Assembly of Italy, and with the encouragement of Randolfo Pacciardi he joined the Italian Republican Party, commonly known as the PRI.

Designated to represent Italy to the International Monetary Fund in 1947, he was named vice president of the Fund the following year.  Meanwhile, with Giulio Andrea Belloni and Oronzo Reale, he assumed the temporary role of party secretary. Reelected to the parliament in 1948, and confirmed into the subsequent legislature, he held numerous positions, including as a "minister without portfolio" charged with reorganizing the Institute for Industrial Reconstruction (IRI), before in 1951 he was appointed Minister of Foreign Trade. His work on liberalizing the Italian economy and lowering import tariffs was fundamental to the "economic miracle."

In 1952 he proposed, without success, a "constituent program" between the secular parties. In 1956, while maintaining the autonomy of the Republican Party from Marxist economic theories and its position on the left of the political spectrum, he favored the unification of the three major socialist schools to make the divide between his party and theirs more comprehensible.

After the Republicans withdrew support for the government in 1957, Randolfo Pacciardi left as director of the party.  La Malfa assumed direction of the party newspaper, La Voce Repubblicana, in 1959.  In 1962 he was named Minister of the Budget in the first center-left government under Amintore Fanfani, following the socialist abstention.  In May he introduced the Nota Aggiuntiva, in which he supplied a general vision of the state of the Italian economy, including the inequalities which characterized it, and delineated the instruments and objects of their regime.  Though criticized for his plan by the Confindustria, the Italian employers union, he decided to nationalize the electricity industry.  On the occasion of the 29th conference of the Republican Party, in March 1965, he was elected party secretary.  The next year he opened a dialog with the help of his old friend Giorgio Amendola, son of Giovanni Amendola, between the republicans and communists, inviting them to leave behind their old orthodoxy and help develop a more pragmatic approach.

During the tumultuous 1970s, the Republican party played a small but vital role in determining the government of Italy and maintaining continuity. Following the fall of Mariano Rumor's third government in 1970, La Malfa refused the invitation of incoming Prime Minister Emilio Colombo to take the role of Minister of the Treasury. For him, the government was not in position to delineate a strategic plan for financing reforms with their education, health, and transportation services, and Colombo only lasted one year in the job. La Malfa pulled his party out of the subsequent Giulio Andreotti government over the issue of state control of cable television . Asked again in 1973 by Mariano Rumor's fourth government he accepted the job of Minister of the Treasury. In that position he blocked the request to grant increased emergency financing to Finambro, a bank owned by Michele Sindona, opening the door to the collapse of Sindona's banking empire and his eventual indictment. He resigned as Minister in February over disagreements in fiscal policy with the Minister of the Budget, pulling the PRI's support for that government and causing its collapse. That December he was named deputy Prime Minister in the fourth government of his friend Aldo Moro, and in 1975 he assumed the presidency of the Republican party with Oddo Biasini replacing him as secretary.

The last years of his life were among his most productive. Upon defeating resistance from left-wing republicans in 1976, La Malfa brought the party into the pan-European federation which later became the European Liberal Democrat and Reform Party. In 1978, his action was able to determine Italy's decision to join the European Monetary System. Following the kidnapping and murder of Aldo Moro, La Malfa gave a tearful and memorable speech in the Chamber of Deputies condemning terrorism and the Red Brigades. Though nominated by President Sandro Pertini as Prime Minister in early 1979, the first secular politician to reach this stage, he was unable to form a government, and later became deputy Prime Minister and then Minister of the Budget in Giulio Andreotti's second government.

On 24 March 1979, he suffered a cerebral hemorrhage, and died two days later in Rome.

Legacy 
For many, La Malfa was "the needle" that sewed the Italian republic together and kept it from coming undone, especially because of his role as a peacemaker between contrasting parties. He understood the futility and irresponsibility of governing without the communists, who held upwards of one third of the seats in parliament. His economic principles, though they often appeared unrealistic and visionary, such as a common European monetary system, were revolutionary and helped make Italy for many years second in economic growth only to West Germany. His commitment to infrastructure within the Mezzogiorno has aided commerce there for fifty years.

In Rome, Piazzale Romolo e Remo was renamed Piazzale Ugo La Malfa, and his hometown of Palermo named Via Ugo La Malfa in honor of him.

His son Giorgio La Malfa is president of the PRI, and was Minister for European Affairs in Italy until 2006.

See also
Italian Republican Party

Notes
Paolo Soddu, Ugo La Malfa. Il riformista moderno, Carocci, Roma 2008.

References

External links 
Official site of the Ugo La Malfa Foundation

1903 births
1979 deaths
Politicians from Palermo
Action Party (Italy) politicians
Republican Democratic Concentration politicians
Italian Republican Party politicians
Transport ministers of Italy
Members of the National Council (Italy)
Members of the Constituent Assembly of Italy
Deputies of Legislature I of Italy
Deputies of Legislature II of Italy
Deputies of Legislature III of Italy
Deputies of Legislature IV of Italy
Deputies of Legislature V of Italy
Deputies of Legislature VI of Italy
Deputies of Legislature VII of Italy
Italian anti-fascists
Deputy Prime Ministers of Italy
Exiled Italian politicians
Italian resistance movement members